Vega 1 (along with its twin Vega 2) was a Soviet space probe, part of the Vega program. The spacecraft was a development of the earlier Venera craft. They were designed by Babakin Space Centre and constructed as 5VK by Lavochkin at Khimki. The name VeGa (ВеГа) combines the first two letters from the Russian words for Venus (Венера: "Venera") and Halley (Галлея: "Galleya").

The craft was powered by twin large solar panels and instruments included an antenna dish, cameras, spectrometer, infrared sounder, magnetometers (MISCHA), and plasma probes. The  craft was launched by a Proton 8K82K rocket from Baikonur Cosmodrome, Tyuratam, Kazakh SSR.  Both Vega 1 and 2 were three-axis stabilized spacecraft.  The spacecraft were equipped with a dual bumper shield for dust protection from Halley's comet.

Venus mission 
The descent module arrived at Venus on 11 June 1985, two days after being released from the Vega 1 flyby probe. The flyby probe performed a gravitational assist maneuver using Venus, and continued its mission to intercept the comet.

Descent craft

The surface lander was identical to that of Vega 2 as well as the previous six Venera missions. The objective of the probe was the study of the atmosphere and the exposed surface of the planet. The scientific payload included an ultraviolet spectrometer, temperature and pressure sensors, a water concentration meter, a gas-phase chromatograph, an X-ray spectrometer, a mass spectrometer, and a surface sampling device.  Since the probe made a nighttime landing, no images were taken. Several of these scientific tools (the UV spectrometer, the mass spectrograph, and the devices to measure pressure and temperature) were developed in collaboration with French scientists.

Only the mass spectrometer was able to return data.

Tools on the lander include:
 Thermometers
 Barometers
 UV absorption spectrometer—ISAV-S
 Optical aerosol analyzer, Nephelometer—ISAV-A
 Aerosol particle-size counter—LSA
 Aerosol mass spectrometer—MALAKHIT-M 
 Aerosol gas chromatograph—SIGMA-3
 Aerosol X-ray fluorescence spectrometer—IFP
 Hygrometer—VM-4
 Soil X-ray fluorescence spectrometer—BDRP-AM25 
 Gamma-ray spectrometer—GS-15STsV
 Penetrometer / Soil ohmmeter—Prop-V
 Stabilized oscillator / Doppler radio

Balloon

The cap and parachute were released 15 seconds later at  altitude. The balloon package was pulled out of its compartment by parachute 40 seconds later at  altitude, at 8.1 degrees N, 176.9 degrees east.

The probe crossed the terminator from night to day at 12:20 UT on 12 June after traversing . It is not known how much farther the balloon traveled after the final communication.

Halley mission 
After their encounters, the Vegas' motherships used the gravity of Venus, also known as a gravity assist, to intercept Halley's Comet.

Images started to be returned on 4 March 1986, and were used to help pinpoint Giotto's close flyby of the comet. The early images from Vega showed two bright areas on the comet, which were initially interpreted as a double nucleus. The bright areas would later turn out to be two jets emitting from the comet. The conclusion was that the comet had a thin layer on its surface covering an icy body.

It took more than 500 pictures via different filters as it flew through the gas cloud around the coma. Although the spacecraft was battered by dust, none of the instruments were disabled during the encounter.

The data intensive examination of the comet covered only the three hours around closest approach. They were intended to measure the physical parameters of the nucleus, such as dimensions, shape, temperature and surface properties, as well as to study the structure and dynamics of the coma, the gas composition close to the nucleus, the dust particles' composition and mass distribution as functions of distance to the nucleus and the cometary-solar wind interaction.

The dust mass spectrometer detected material similar to the composition of carbonaceous chondrites meteorites and also detected clathrate ice.

After subsequent imaging sessions on 7 and 8 March 1986, Vega 1 headed out to deep space. In total Vega 1 and Vega 2 returned about 1500 images of Comet Halley. Vega 1 ran out of attitude control propellant on 30 January 1987, and contact with Vega 2 continued until 24 March 1987.

Vega 1 is currently in heliocentric orbit, with perihelion of 0.70 AU, aphelion of 0.98 AU, eccentricity of 0.17, inclination of 2.3 degrees and orbital period of 281 days.

See also

List of missions to Venus

References

External links

Vega 1 Measuring Mission Profile by NASA's Solar System Exploration
Vega mission images from the Space Research Institute (IKI)
Raw data from Vega 1 and Vega 2 on board instruments
Soviet Exploration of Venus
 Vega 1 Mission Comet Halley Data Archive at the NASA Planetary Data System, Small Bodies Node

Missions to Halley's Comet
Vega program
Derelict satellites in heliocentric orbit
1984 in spaceflight
1984 in the Soviet Union
Derelict space probes
France–Soviet Union relations
Extraterrestrial aircraft
Spacecraft launched in 1984
Extraterrestrial atmosphere entry